was the sixteenth of the sixty-nine stations of the Nakasendō. It is located in the present-day city of Annaka, Gunma Prefecture, Japan, at the foot of Mount Myōgi.

Travel towards Kyoto
Usuinoseki Checkpoint was one of the four major checkpoints along the Nakasendō and was between Matsuida-shuku and Sakamoto-shuku. Travelers who wanted to avoid this checkpoint could make use of a hime kaidō that would take them over the mountains and to Oiwake-shuku, the twentieth station on the Nakasendō.

Neighboring Post Towns
Nakasendō
Annaka-shuku - Matsuida-shuku - Sakamoto-shuku

References

Post stations in Gunma Prefecture
Stations of the Nakasendō